Max Mirnyi and Daniel Nestor defended the title winning against Ivan Dodig and Marcelo Melo 4–6, 7–5, [10–7].

Seeds

Draw

Draw

References
 Main Draw

Regions Morgan Keegan Championships - Doubles
2012 Regions Morgan Keegan Championships and Memphis International